John William Michael Moore (25 September 1923 – September 2012) was an English footballer who played in the Football League as a wing-half for Brentford and Colchester United.

Career

Born in Chiswick, London, Moore represented London and Middlesex as a schoolboy and joined First Division side Brentford as a junior after leaving school. The club wanted Moore to sign a professional contract, but the suspension of competitive football due to the breakout of the Second World War in 1939. During the war, Moore guested with Manchester City, Derry City and along with other serving footballers Bill Baxter, Bobby Mitchell and John Aston, won a cup final with Australian club Canterbury-Bankstown, played at the Sydney Cricket Ground. After the war, Moore received interest from First Division side Wolverhampton Wanderers, but returned to Brentford after Harry Curtis offered him a professional contract.

Moore made his Brentford debut on 10 May 1947 in a 1–0 defeat against Bolton Wanderers in the First Division, the first full season following World War II. Behind Archie Macaulay in the pecking order, Moore only made four appearances for the club and played his last game in a 3–0 defeat at Luton Town in the Second Division on 3 September 1947. He saw out his time with the Bees in the reserve team.

On leaving Brentford, Moore turned down a move to Second Division side Leeds United and signed for Gloucester City in the Southern League, where he made 52 appearances and scored 13 goals during the 1948–49 season before joining fellow Southern League club Colchester United at the end of the season for a fee of £1,000.

Moore was signed as an understudy to Harry Bearryman, and made his first-team debut on 8 September 1949 in a 3–1 away defeat at Chingford Town. He was unable to displace Bill Layton from the first-team and by January 1950 was made captain of the reserve team. He made 13 Southern League appearances for the club, helping the team finish as runners-up in the league and gain election to the Football League. In the Football League, Moore did not make an appearance during Colchester's inaugural 1950–51 season, but made two appearances for the club in 1951–52.

Moore left Layer Road in the summer of 1952 following his final game on 5 January 1952, a 7–0 demolition by Leyton Orient at Brisbane Road. He joined Yeovil on trial in October of the same year but after a fortnight returned to London, looking for a club closer to his home. He later played for Staines Town and Hastings United, the latter club managed by his brother-in-law Ted Ballard.

Personal life 
Moore attended Chiswick School and during the Second World War, he served in the Fleet Air Arm. After his retirement from football, Moore became a car salesman. In August 1997, at age 74, he was working as a chauffeur.

Honours
Colchester United
1949–50 Southern Football League runner-up

All honours referenced by:

References

1923 births
2012 deaths
Footballers from Chiswick
English footballers
Association football wing halves
Hayes F.C. players
Brentford F.C. players
Gloucester City A.F.C. players
Colchester United F.C. players
Staines Town F.C. players
English Football League players
Hastings United F.C. (1948) players
Southern Football League players
Manchester City F.C. wartime guest players
Fleet Air Arm personnel of World War II